Work Is a Four-Letter Word (also known as Work Is a 4-Letter Word) is a 1968 British satirical comedy film directed by Peter Hall and starring David Warner and Cilla Black, in her only acting role in a cinematic film. The film was not well received by critics even though it was based on the award-winning play Eh? It also marked the acting debut of Elizabeth Spriggs.

Plot
Everyone is employed by the ultra-modern DICE Corporation but Valentine Brose (Warner) would rather stay at home to tend his psychedelic mushrooms. However, his bedroom is too small and his fiancée Betty Dorrick (Black) wants him to settle down. Accordingly, Brose seeks a job in DICE's boiler-room, a suitable environment to grow his mushrooms.

The plot describes his attempts to get the job, and the conflicts with middle-management, including the personnel manager, Mrs Murray (Spriggs, in her first film role). Having obtained it, Brose is more interested in his mushrooms than tending the boiler, with unforeseen results including a major power cut. The boiler room contains a computer (for some reason), which towards the end of the film is also breaking down.

Brose eventually marries Betty, but is more interested in having her sweep up the boiler room so he can concentrate on his first love, the mushrooms. Eventually he goes haywire and the film ends with Brose and Betty loading up a pram with mushrooms and escaping.

Cast

Production

Writing
The screenplay was written by Jeremy Brooks who adapted it the play Eh? by Henry Livings. It premiered in New York City on 16 October 1966. Livings won an Obie Award for Best Play the same year.

Casting
David Warner had established a reputation for playing off-beat roles, including the title role in Morgan: A Suitable Case For Treatment (1966) and was a member of the Royal Shakespeare Company, of which Peter Hall was artistic director until the year of the film's release.

Cilla Black had not previously had a starring role; she had appeared briefly as herself in Ferry Cross The Mersey (1965), a vehicle for Gerry and the Pacemakers. She recorded the theme song for the film, having the same title, which was released as the B side of "Where Is Tomorrow?" in 1968; the single reached number 39 in the UK Charts. This would be Black's only starring role in film.

Most of the remainder of the cast were members of the Royal Shakespeare Company (Waller, Howard, Church et al.) or stalwarts of British realist drama (Gladwin).

Filming
The film was shot on location at Belvedere Power Station (now demolished) which was located on the south side of the Thames near Erith, England. Interiors were completed at Shepperton Studios near London.

Reception
At the time Variety compared the film thematically with Charlie Chaplin's Modern Times but was critical of its "irritating air of improvisation" and described the storyline as "thin", albeit praising some of the off-beat situations as "very funny".

Leslie Halliwell, in his Film Guide, was even more scathing, describing it pithily as a "weakly futuristic industrial fantasy which the author would probably claim to be about lack of communication. Bored audiences might have a similar view".

Cultural references
English indie rock band the Smiths covered the film's title song for the B-side of their 1987 single "Girlfriend in a Coma". Smiths guitarist Johnny Marr has stated in interviews that one of the main impetuses for his leaving the band was singer Morrissey's insistence on covering the song. In a 1992 issue of Record Collector, Marr stated, "'Work Is a Four Letter Word' I hated. That was the last straw, really. I didn't form a group to perform Cilla Black songs. That was it, really. I made a decision that I was going to get away on holiday. The only place I could think of was L.A. L.A. was the only place I knew where there'd be sunshine, so off I went. I never saw Morrissey again."

Home media

The film has never been released on home media.  The film has rarely been seen on TV.

References

External links

"Work is a Four Letter Word" at Allmovies.com

1968 films
1968 comedy films
British comedy films
Films shot at Pinewood Studios
1960s English-language films
1960s British films